Dendrosenecio erici-rosenii one of the East African giant groundsel and this one can be found on the Rwenzori Mountains, Virunga Mountains and the Mitumba Mountains. It is a species of the genus Dendrosenecio and is also a collection of reclassified Senecio species.

Description
Dendrosenecio erici-rosenii grows to 6 meters tall. The old leaves drop off and leave a very slender stem. Flower heads have very prominent yellow ray flowers.

Distribution
Dendrosenecio erici-rosenii is found more on sloping, better-drained soils on the Rwenzori, Virunga, and Mitumba mountains between 3,500 and 4,500 meters. It is also found between 4,400 and 5,000 meters but does not produce flowers there.

Infraspecific name synonymy
The names for the giant groundsels have become somewhat confusing:
Dendrosenecio erici-rosenii (R.E.Fr. & T.C.E.Fr.) E.B.Knox
Dendrosenecio erici-rosenii (R.E.Fr. & T.C.E.Fr.) E.B.Knox subsp. alticola (Mildbr.) E.B.Knox
Senecio adnivalis Stapf var. alticola (T.C.E.Fr.) Hedberg  
Senecio adnivalis Stapf var. intermedia Hauman   
Senecio alticola T.C.E.Fr. var. subcalvescens Hauman   
Senecio johnstonii Oliv. var. alticola (T.C.E.Fr.) C.Jeffrey  
Senecio refractisquamatus De Wild. var. intermedia (Hauman) Robyns 
Dendrosenecio erici-rosenii (R.E.Fr. & T.C.E.Fr.) E.B.Knox subsp. erici-rosenii  
Senecio erici-rosenii R.E.Fr. & T.C.E.Fr.  
Senecio johnstonii Oliv. var. erici-rosenii (R.E.Fr. & T.C.E.Fr.) C.Jeffrey  
Senecio kahuzicus Humb.  
Senecio longeligulatus De Wild.

References

External links

erici-rosenii
Flora of Rwanda
Flora of the Democratic Republic of the Congo
Flora of Uganda
Rwenzori Mountains
Virunga Mountains
Afromontane flora
Plants described in 1922